Volstagg is a fictional character appearing in American comic books published by Marvel Comics. He is a charter member of the Warriors Three, a trio of Asgardian adventurers and supporting cast of Thor. He is known for having multiple children. These include, but are not limited to, Hilde, Rolfe, and the adopted Midgardians Kevin and Mick.

Ray Stevenson portrayed the character in the Marvel Cinematic Universe films Thor (2011), Thor: The Dark World (2013), and Thor: Ragnarok (2017).

Publication history

Volstagg first appeared in Journey into Mystery #119 (August, 1965), and was created by Stan Lee and Jack Kirby.

He is not taken from Norse (or any other) mythology but is an original creation, modeled on Shakespeare's Falstaff in character and name.

Fictional character biography

Early battles
Volstagg's origin story beyond being a member of the Asgardian race, a warrior and adventurer, and a friend of Thor has not been revealed. Volstagg is fairly advanced in age for an Asgardian, and it has been suggested that he was a highly respected and feared warrior in his prime.

In a sense, Volstagg's entire career has been one long origin story. The character was first introduced in a "Tales of Asgard" filler in Journey Into Mystery #119 (August 1965), the magazine carrying Thor's Asgardian adventures. As originally envisioned by Jack Kirby, Volstagg was a huge, bumbling oaf much given to boasting and bragging: the last into battle and the first to claim victory (usually undeserved). Referring to himself as "The Lion of Asgard", he usually caused more problems than he solved and seemed totally unaware of the chaos that almost always followed in his wake. A flashback revealed in Captain Marvel #42 tells how a drunken Volstagg incurred the wrath of Odin by spilling the secrets of the first Frost Giants to a younger Thor. Strangely enough, he was considered a trusted and worthy comrade by his closest friends and allies, Fandral the Dashing, Hogun the Grim, and Thor.

Another flashback showed Volstagg as a thin but muscular man, a great confidante of Thor himself. Hogun and Fandrall, practically strangers to him at the time, join with a quest on a dare to simply "pet" the Fenris wolf. The creature deals them a humiliating defeat. Advanced Idea Mechanics, having their own personal interest in Fenris, theorize it is this defeat that led to Volstagg's unhealthy eating habits.

In his first comic book appearance, Volstagg joined with the Warriors Three in Thor's quest for the power that had cracked the Odinsword of Asgard. Though Volstagg, Fandral and Hogun had been recruited by Loki, they proved loyal to Thor when the time came. Volstagg's first battle involved him mainly falling onto his enemies. Volstagg then helped repel the attack of the Flying Trolls of Thryheim, although he cowered for much of the fight. Volstagg helped defeat the forces of Harokin. Though this man was an avowed enemy of Asgard, he fought so well and nobly that Hela herself came to fetch him when a lifetime of wounds caught up with the warlord. Volstagg and the other Asgardians assisted as much as they could in Harokin's ride to Valhalla, for they all honored a warrior, even one in opposition. Later, Odin send the Warriors Three and Thor to a long demolished land. Volstagg was lured into a trap by the dragon Fafnir who used an illusion. In another incident the four went to free Hogun's land from the murderous tyrant called Mogul of the Mystic Mountain; Volstagg's bumbling caused him to lose his companions and gain a new one. However, as soon as he gained a weapon that was capable of opposing Mogul, he rushed back to his friends to assist in the battle.

In another flashback appearance, Volstagg mistook a mystical portal for a warming fire and literally fell into it. A rescue mission causes a destructive battle which then gives the Great Sphinx of Giza its unique face.

As regular cast member
As the Warriors Three made increasingly frequent appearances in The Mighty Thor and other Marvel titles, a slightly more heroic side to his personality began to emerge. In Tales To Astonish #101, Volstagg squared-off with The Incredible Hulk for two panels (before being dumped contemptuously in a roadside ditch by the green-skinned behemoth); Volstagg helped defend Asgard against the demonic Mangog (a creature possessed of the power of a "billion billion" beings) and in Thor #164, the Lion of Asgard rushed through a tunnel to battle Mangog but was prevented when the passage proved too narrow to accommodate his considerable girth. During a trip to Hades to rescue his comrade-in-arms Thor, Volstagg offered to battle Mephisto in return for his friend's soul (despite being aware that the God of Thunder had already bested the Lord of Hell in fair combat some time previously). Ultimately, he helped Thor escape Mephisto.

A real change to Volstagg's character came in the early seventies, when Thor and the Warriors Three were battling the interstellar parasite Ego-Prime in the streets of New York City: hiding behind a festering heap of garbage, Volstagg saw a group of extraterrestrial monstrosities preparing to devour a little girl, a sight which drove him to a remarkable (for him) display of courage and resolution. Despite his obvious terror, the Volumous One struck the creatures down with his bare hands and carried the child to safety (it would be revealed much later that Volstagg was himself a family man and would never stand to see an innocent child harmed in any way).

Under Walt Simonson
Following a brief hiatus towards the end of the seventies, Volstagg underwent a renaissance of sorts when Walt Simonson took over The Mighty Thor in 1982. Reaching back to Kirby's initial concept, Simonson redefines Volstagg as a big, likeable bear of a man, a friend to all with a song in their heart (and a glass in their hand). A good-natured old warrior somewhat past his prime, Volstagg is still held in high regard by his comrades, if only for his amusing company and unparalleled drinking ability. Simonson also added another dimension previously unseen in his earlier incarnations — a household full of children.

This updated persona becomes a crucial plot device in several of Simonson's classic story arcs: when Balder the Brave returns broken and hopeless from the land of the dead, Volstagg takes the fallen warrior under his wing, introducing him to the twin joys of gluttony and drunkenness.

When Surtur the fire demon rouses his forces to attack Earth, the Warriors Three are tasked by Odin to gather all the soldiers at his command. It is noted that such a task makes even Volstagg quiet. Later, during the battle proper in Manhattan, his boasting returns but his skill for battle is ever-present. The temptations of Earth do compel him to stay behind but Hogun stops this; he shoots Volstagg in the backside with approximately a dozen Migdardian tranquilizer darts. This is enough to stun and confuse the warrior. In a later plotline, when Thor's actions indirectly orphan two humans (Kevin and Mick), he takes them to Asgard and places them under Volstagg's care - a situation he gladly accepts.

New Mutants
Volstagg and his family have also encountered the New Mutants. During the group's first trip to Asgard, Volstagg makes friends with Roberto DaCosta, aka Sunspot, challenging him to feats of strength, including arm-wrestling and the lifting of Volstagg himself.

In the group's second visit, Volstagg's children encounter Boom Boom, Hrimhari and Warlock, who were on the run from Hela's forces. Hela herself is currently following through with a plan to kill Odin and conquer Asgard. The children switch places with the group so as to emphasize to their elders, when they return, of the seriousness of the situation. They tell the heroes of Tiwaz, a powerful sorcerer who might help them in the fight. Hrimhari, wolf-prince of a far-away tribe of wolf-people, tells the children that tales of Volstagg's children were told to his people and it was an honor to be in their debt. Boom Boom, Warlock and Hrimhari rescue the Warriors Three from being slain by Queen Ula and her hive. The sheer girth of Volstagg is enough to delay the plans but Tiwaz provides a magical spell to temporarily shrink the enormous warrior. The Warriors Three, various Asgardians and even Queen Ula's troops join with the New Mutants; their efforts stop Hela from killing Odin.

Volstagg is later overcome by a mystery plague. He then helped defend Asgard against the forces of Seth. He went on a quest with Thor to seek Ulagg. He helped the Avengers battle Blastaar. Volsagg then battled Ymir and Surtur. He also attempted to prevent the second Thor (Eric Masterson) from entering Asgard.

Soon after this point, when Odin is awake and aware, his mind becomes overtaken by the influence of Loki. Persecuted, the Warriors Three are forced to go on the run, gaining a new ally in the form of a young palace guardsman named Arko. After this is cleared up, the trio and Thor are involved in the dishonorable death of a giant's son. To redeem themselves, they set out on an adventure involving multiple heroic efforts. Volstagg suffers greatly over the course of this quest.

Volstagg's role
Volstagg was used primarily as comedy relief in the same way Falstaff, who Volstagg was modeled on, was comedy relief in Shakespeare's Henry IV. Stan Lee admitted his comics were inspired by Shakespeare, his Asgardians speaking in an English halfway between Shakespeare and the King James Bible. Volstagg's name is derived from Falstaff and the Volsunga Saga of Norse mythology.

Volstagg, like Falstaff, is fat, vain, boastful, and cowardly, but also boon companion to the prince (Hal or Thor). He seems to know more about raising a mug (his favorite weapon, evidently) than raising a sword (of which he actually knew very little). Ironically, whenever his courage fails (at the slightest sign of danger), Volstagg's innate clumsiness would somehow seize victory from the jaws of defeat. In a typically Kirbyesque touch, Volstagg inadvertently saves his companions' lives on at least two occasions by stumbling onto the one weapon capable of saving the day (and later claiming that his initial cowardly retreat was all part of a vast master plan).

There have been at least two sub stories about Volstagg's past that presented him as exceptionally well built and a capable warrior. On the other hand, in the Thor: Son of Asgard series (confirmed to be canonical from Official Handbook files of Asgardians), Volstagg is depicted as obese and cowardly even as a young man. Oddly enough, while apparently somewhat older than Thor, he does not seem to be considerably older.

It has also been hinted at on numerous occasions that he ceased his full-time warrior's life to be a husband and father.

Ragnarok and rebirth
Eventually, Loki brings about Ragnarok. The initial attack destroys the realm of the dwarves. The Warriors Three escape to Alfheim, home of the light elves. They bring Sif, who had lost an arm. Naglfar, a flying ship made from the fingernails of the dead, follows and rains arrows. Fandral and Hogun are lost. Sif, confused and disoriented, escapes. Volstagg makes a home in a statue of Frigg. He buries all he can and burns the bodies of the rest. His trials make him lose considerable weight.

He re-unites with Thor, who talks him out of his despair and gives him the uru-spawned hammer of Geirrodur, king of the trolls. Thor had met the troll in battle and slain him, taking his weapon. Loki had, weeks ago, used the mold that made Thor's hammer and created many more similar weapons. Volstagg later is granted a second of these weapons, one used by Ulik, another vanquished enemy.

The final battle of Ragnarok takes place in Vanaheim. There, Volstagg fights with the last of the Asgardian defenders. Surtur, freed by Thor to grant his people a meaningful final death, leads the charge. A soldier of Surtur spears Volstagg from behind while feet away, Sif is pierced by arrows and dies as well.

As with all Asgardians, he has returned, this time to Midgard, where a new version of Asgard has arisen in Oklahoma. All the Warriors Three were in the forms of three soldiers in Africa, and are the second group to be reborn. During the 'Secret Invasion' crossover, Asgard is threatened by various powered Skrulls. Volstagg is essential in distracting the Super-Skrull sent to destroy Asgard; the aliens are defeated.

Siege
Volstagg is later responsible for setting events in motion that would allow the Siege of Asgard to occur, after he heads to Chicago seeking to have adventures like those of Thor. He stops a robbery but causes a lot of damage. He is attacked by the U-Foes (who were operating under orders of Norman Osborn and Loki). The incident destroys Soldier Field in Chicago, killing many. However, Volstagg was framed, making it seem as if his incompetence killed innocents.

Ben Urich and Will Stern, reporters from New York and Chicago, later encounter Volstagg who is returning to Asgard to turn himself in after what happened at Soldier Field. The two realize Osborn is using Volstagg to better himself in the public opinion. They befriend Volstagg, who allows them to travel with him to Asgard for a fresh perspective on the situation.

Ben Urich, Will Stern and Volstagg reach a roadblock as they approach Broxton, Oklahoma and are spotted in their news van by H.A.M.M.E.R. agents, a group controlled by Osborn. Volstagg exits the van and engages the agents directly while Ben and Will speed off but are caught only moments later.

In the Broxton jail, Volstagg is speaking to the sheriff and his deputy as the news reports on the attack on Asgard, showing footage of Thor being beaten down. Realizing that what's going on is wrong, the sheriff releases Volstagg so that he can go help defend his home. Volstagg stops though, when he realizes all the lies that are being spread about him and the other Asgardians. The sheriff sets him up in front of a webcam, and Volstagg sends out a video to the world about what really happened in Chicago. Word quickly spreads, and people everywhere are beginning to question Norman Osborn and H.A.M.M.E.R.'s attack on Asgard. As Volstagg is leaving the police station, Thor lands in front of him and smacks him to the ground. Volstagg realizes that this is not the true Thor; this is the clone, Ragnarok. He battles the clone in a deserted field to avoid more damage but is beaten. Ben and Will meet up with Volstagg again, and all three assist injured Asgardians after the city has fallen. Finally when Osborn tries to escape after the events, Volstagg stops him with a knockout blow. Volstagg later spends time assisting in rebuilding Soldier Field.

When Odin plans to destroy the Earth to save the rest of the known Worlds from the Fear Serpent, Volstagg is forced to be one of men keeping Thor under control. Odin changes his plans, leading an army to Midgard to slay the Serpent. The Warriors Three, at the forefront, are just in time to see the Serpent and Thor slay each other in battle.

Rebuilding
In Journey Into Mystery, Volstagg protects the de-aged Loki despite his misgivings about his former foe. He often regrets his actions but reminds himself he took an oath. His family is reestablished as existing during Fear Itself. Volstagg takes up liaison duties between Broxton, Oklahoma and his reformed homeland, now called Asgardia and ruled by the All-Mother. Volstagg's home life, and his daughter Hilde, are featured in a debacle that lets Fenris loose during the middle of the night. To avoid a beating, Fenris promises to go under his magical leash Gliepnir if Hilde brings him a Golden Apple of Idunn.

Against Surtur
The ancient fire demon Surtur uses the grudges the Vanaheim have against Asgard to inflame a war that affects the nine-realms. When Volstagg thinks Loki is part of it, a suggestion to imprison the trickster leads Thor to battle the Warriors Three. The All-Mother's connection to the Vanaheim causes them to lose their rulership of Asgard and Volstagg becomes the new ruler. He leads a war through much of the nine realms. He tries to give a pardon to the All-Mother but they refuse, saying the people's trust do not match Volstagg's. Later, Surtur's forces are defeated thanks to Loki and Volstagg steps down to rule only over his family once again.

Later, the focus of Journey Into Mystery changes from Loki to Sif. The Surtur war is shown to have almost taken Volstagg's son Arnor when Asgardia's library burns. Sif saves him. Later, Volstagg's pacifist daughter is struck by the broken sword of Fandral the Dashing thrown by an angry Sif.

The various lands in the nine realms reorganize themselves with the Congress of Worlds. Volstagg becomes Asgard's senator to this grouping.

When Thor becomes unable to move his hammer from the moon, he encourages Volstagg (and others) to lift it. Volstagg tries and is unable to.

One of Volstagg's many duties in the new political landscape of Asgard is supervising Jane Foster, as she needs a companion on her chemotherapy visits.

Becoming War Thor

As tensions among the Nine Realms escalate due to the return of Cul and the shifting alliances of the Elves, Volstagg, stricken with grief and rage after he witnessed the deaths of several children in a confrontation with Surtur's fire-demons, travels to the remains of ancient Asgard where he claims the discarded hammer of the deceased Ultimate Thor. This transforms him into the "War Thor." Driven by the power of this hammer, Volstagg mounted an assault on Muspelheim, but when he began to threaten children, Jane Foster confronted her old friend to convince him to stand down, although it took Odinson to make Volstagg realize that his actions were only provoking further conflict rather than ending it.

Powers and abilities
Volstagg possesses a number of superhuman attributes conventionally possessed by all Asgardians.

Volstagg possesses superhuman strength. While he is still stronger than most Asgardian males, he is no longer in his physical prime. Aside from his strength, some of Volstagg's other physical capabilities have decreased, mostly due to his obesity. Volstagg's speed, stamina, and agility are now inferior to that of the majority of his race.

Volstagg is extremely long lived, although not truly immortal, and ages much slower than a human being. The tissues of his body are also superhumanly resistant to physical injury. It is possible to injure him but his life-force enables him to recover with superhuman speed and efficiency.

Volstagg has demonstrated the ability to increase his mass to make himself nearly unmovable.

In a number of stories, Volstagg is represented as an excellent overall battlefield warrior and is highly proficient in all Asgardian weapons; an excellent hand-to-hand combatant, swordsman, horseman, and archer, a superb pugilist and a master of the quarterstaff. Volstagg's battle prowess is somewhat limited by his advanced age and tremendous girth. However, Volstagg is still capable of using his sheer bulk to his advantage in combat situations. He can consume vast quantities of food and drink.

Other versions

Earth X
In the alternate Earth X reality, the Asgardians were actually aliens that were manipulated by the Celestials into believing they were the Gods of Norse myth. When the lie was revealed, "Volstagg" and the other Asgardians briefly resumed their alien form, but later returned to their Asgardian forms. Volstagg appeared again to deny Doctor Strange's army passage to Lord Odin's castle. This attempt failed and all of the Warriors Three die. However this was used as a larger plan for Thor to eliminate the realm of Hel itself.

Marvel Adventures
The Warriors Three appear briefly in the Marvel Adventures universe in a supporting capacity. They were the first Asgardians to assist the Avengers in driving Malekith and his forces out of Asgard.

Marvel Zombies
In the Marvel Zombies alternate universe, many heroes attend Nick Fury's briefing on how to deal with the zombie plague, including Volstagg.

MC2
An older version of Volstagg has appeared in the alternate future series called Last Planet Standing.

Mutant X
Volstagg was one of many who fought the Beyonder and died in the Mutant X universe.

Thor: The Mighty Avenger
A young Thor meets the Warriors Three in Thor: The Mighty Avenger. The trio had arrived on Midgard to check in on Thor's mission, only to find out the warrior had no idea what that mission was. Unwilling to tell Thor what it was, the group go out drinking in Europe. There they meet, fight and then befriend Captain Britain.

Ultimate Marvel
Volstagg the Voluminous briefly appears in Ultimates 2 #1, meeting with Thor at the Terrace in the Sky restaurant in Morningside Heights. He is there to warn Thor of Loki's plot against him. None of the other patrons can see Volstagg, and it was unclear at the time whether this is due to Loki's interference or whether Volstagg is merely a delusion of Thor. During the discussion, Volstagg states that Loki is rewriting reality even as they speak; Loki then shows up in one panel as one of the restaurant patrons. At the end of Ultimates 2, Thor was proven to be a god and it is inferred that Loki was indeed interfering. Volstagg along with the Warrior's Three, also appear in Ultimate Comics: Thor. At first, they were sparring partners to Loki, Thor and Balder. In this continuity Volstagg holds a position of authority concerning the wall surrounding Asgard itself.  Later, the trio seemingly sacrificed themselves in a delaying attack against Frost Giants and mystically charged Nazis. Volstagg, and most Asgardians are slain off-panel by the 'Children', a futuristic society led by a maddened Reed Richards.

In other media

Television
 Volstagg made a cameo appearance on the Spider-Man and His Amazing Friends episode "The Vengeance of Loki!".
 Volstagg (alongside the other Warriors Three members) appears in The Super Hero Squad Show, voiced by Ted Biaselli. In the episode "Oh Brother", he and the other Warriors Three members are shown fighting an army of Frost Giants. In the episodes "Mental Organism Designed Only for Kissing" and "Invader from the Dark Dimension", Volstagg alongside Fandral and Hogun are featured in a flashback being in a band with Thor.
 Volstagg appears in The Avengers: Earth's Mightiest Heroes voiced by Fred Tatasciore.
 Volstagg appears in the Avengers Assemble episode "Planet Doom", voiced again by Fred Tatasciore. He is seen feasting when Thor arrives in Asgard where Thor was late for Thor's Day.
 Volstagg appears in the Hulk and the Agents of S.M.A.S.H. episode "For Asgard", voiced again by Fred Tatasciore. He assists his fellow Warriors Three members, Thor, Heimdall, and the Agents of S.M.A.S.H. into fighting Malekith the Accursed and his Dark Elves.
 Volstagg appears in the Guardians of the Galaxy episode "Asgard War Part One: Lightning Strikes." He was present on Asgard when Loki addresses him and the other Asgardians at the time when Thor was leading the other Asgardians in the war against Spartax.

Film
 Volstagg makes an appearance in the animated direct-to-video film Hulk vs. Thor voiced by Jay Brazeau. He along with the rest of the Warriors Three blindly ride off to battle the Hulk.
 Volstagg appears in the animated direct-to-video film Thor: Tales of Asgard, voiced by Brent Chapman.

 Volstagg appears in the 2011 live-action film Thor played by Ray Stevenson. Stevenson reprises the role in Thor: The Dark World and Thor: Ragnarok.

Novels
Volstagg has a cameo in the Thor novel Dueling With Giants. Along with Fandral, Hogun and other Asgardians he races to meet a threat of trolls who have evaded Heimdall's senses.

Video games
Volstagg appears as a limited time unlockable character in Marvel: Avengers Alliance. If unlocked, he can be recruited and interacts specially in battle with Hogun or Fandral if either is in the player party.

References

External links
 
 

Characters created by Jack Kirby
Characters created by Stan Lee
Comics characters introduced in 1965
Fictional characters with superhuman durability or invulnerability
Marvel Comics Asgardians
Marvel Comics characters who can move at superhuman speeds
Marvel Comics characters with accelerated healing
Marvel Comics characters with superhuman strength
Marvel Comics superheroes
Norse mythology in Marvel Comics
Superhero film characters